Brighton Beach Memories — Neil Sedaka Sings Yiddish is a 2003 album by Neil Sedaka for Sameach Music. Sedaka went on to perform the songs with the Klezmatics as a benefit for The National Yiddish Theater Folksbiene in 2004.

Track listing
Vi Ahin Zol Ich Geyn
Shein Vi Di L'Vone
"My Yiddeshe Mamme"
Eishes Chayil
"Bei Mir Bist Du Shein"
Mein Shtetele Belz
"Tumbalalaika"
Sunrise, Sunset
"Ochi chyornye" (Dark Eyes (song))
"Exodus" main theme from the film
Ich Hob Dich Tzufil Lieb
Anniversary Song
Tzena Tzena Tzena

References

2003 albums
Neil Sedaka albums